Katherine Hood McCormick (1882-1960), was an American painter known for her watercolors and wood block prints. She was an original member of the Philadelphia Ten.

Biography
McCormick was born in 1882 in Philadelphia, Pennsylvania. She attended the Pennsylvania Academy of the Fine Arts, studying under Henry McCarter, and Fred Wagner. She continued her training at Drexel Institute in Philadelphia, and then at the School for Social Research in New York City.

Throughout her career McCormick exhibited at the Pennsylvania Academy of the Fine Arts in Philadelphia and  the National Academy of Design in New York. In 1917 she participated in the first exhibition of the Philadelphia Ten at the Art Club of Philadelphia.

McCormick was a member of the Philadelphia Ten, the American Color Print Society, and the Provincetown Printers.

McCormick died in 1960.

References

External links
 images of Katherine McCormick's paintings on MutualArt

1882 births 
1960 deaths
20th-century American women artists
Pennsylvania Academy of the Fine Arts alumni